Georgy Abashvili (Georgiy Semyonovich Abashvili) (8 January 1910 – 26 September 1982) was a Soviet naval commander and vice-admiral (1955).

An ethnic Georgian, Abashvili was born in Tbilisi, Georgia, then part of the Russian Empire. He graduated from the Leningrad Naval College in 1931 and joined the Soviet Baltic Fleet with which he served through the Finnish campaign and World War II. In 1944, he was deputy chief of staff of the Baltic Fleet and also commanded a division of destroyers which played a vital role in relieving the blockade of Leningrad. In 1953 he was senior officer with the Soviet vessels visiting Poland and in 1954 with those called in Finland. During the Cuban Missile Crisis in 1962, Abashvili was deputy commander-in-chief to Issa Pliyev and naval commander in the proposed Group of Soviet forces in Cuba (Operation Anadyr). According to one account, he was against the immediate use of force during the crisis days. He is said to have delayed the Soviet missile launch order during the height of tensions and became one of the people who contributed in preventing a nuclear war. He retired the same year and died of stroke in Leningrad in 1982.

References 

1910 births
1982 deaths
Military personnel from Tbilisi
People from Tiflis Governorate
Soviet admirals
Soviet Georgian admirals
Soviet military personnel of the Winter War
Soviet military personnel of World War II
People of World War II from Georgia (country)
Recipients of the Order of Lenin
Recipients of the Order of Nakhimov, 2nd class
Recipients of the Order of the Red Banner
Recipients of the Order of the Red Banner of Labour
Recipients of the Order of the Red Star
Burials at Serafimovskoe Cemetery